The 2010 Mississippi State Bulldogs football team represented Mississippi State University during the 2010 NCAA Division I FBS football season. Mississippi State has been a member of the Southeastern Conference (SEC) since the league's inception in 1932, and has participated in that conference's Western Division since 1992. The Bulldogs played their home games at Davis Wade Stadium at Scott Field in Starkville, Mississippi, which has been MSU football's "home" stadium since 1914. The Bulldogs finished the season 9–4, 4–4 in SEC play and faced Michigan in the Gator Bowl, which they won 52–14.  The team finished with a #15 final ranking in the AP Poll, making them 2010's most improved team in the SEC.  Vick Ballard set the school record for rushing TD's in a single season with 19 in the 2010 season.

Preseason
On April 17, 2010, before a crowd of 34,127, the largest in Mississippi history, the Maroon squad defeated the White squad 26-13 in Mississippi State's spring football game held at Davis Wade Stadium Saturday evening.

Schedule

Game summaries

Memphis

Auburn

LSU

Georgia

Alcorn State

Houston

Florida

UAB

Kentucky

Alabama

Arkansas

Ole Miss

Gator Bowl

References

Mississippi State
Mississippi State Bulldogs football seasons
Gator Bowl champion seasons
Mississippi State Bulldogs football